Blore is the surname of:
 Arthur Robert Blore, Royal Navy seaman, winner of the Conspicuous Gallantry Medal and bar
Edward Blore (1787–1879), British landscape and architectural artist, architect and antiquary
Edward Blore (cricketer) (1828–1885), English amateur cricketer
Eric Blore (1887–1959), English comic actor
Gary Blore, rear admiral of the United States Coast Guard
Hannah Blore, Welsh professional sailor
Robert Blore, father and son English sculptors
Vincent Blore (1907–1997), English footballer

See also
Blore, village in Staffordshire, England